Anson Jones (January 20, 1798 – January 9, 1858) was a doctor, businessman, member of Congress, and the fourth and last President of the Republic of Texas.

Early life 
Jones was born on January 20, 1798, in Great Barrington, Massachusetts. He traveled to Seneca Falls, New York, and opened a one-room school. He taught there from 1812 to 1813. In 1820, Jones was licensed as a doctor by the Oneida, New York, Medical Society, and began medical practice in 1822. However, his practice prospered, and he moved several more times before finally being arrested in Philadelphia by a creditor. He stayed in Philadelphia for a few more years, teaching and practicing medicine, until in 1823, he decided to go to Venezuela.

Later, Jones returned to Philadelphia, earned an MD, and reopened his practice. He never had much success as a doctor, and in 1832, he renounced medicine and headed for New Orleans, where he entered the mercantile trade. Once again, though, Jones's dreams were thwarted. Though he safely weathered two plagues, his business efforts never met with any success, and within a year he had no money.

He was a member and Past Master of the Masonic Harmony Lodge No. 52 of Philadelphia. He was a Past Grand of Independent Order of Odd Fellows Washington Lodge no. 2 and Philadelphia Lodge no. 13 in Pennsylvania and a Past Grand Master of the Grand Lodge of Pennsylvania.

Life in Texas 

In 1832, Jones headed west to Texas, settling eventually in Brazoria. Here, at last, he met with success, establishing a medical practice that prospered quickly. In 1835, he began to speak out about the growing tensions between Texas and Mexico, and that year he attended the Consultation, a meeting held at Columbia, by Texas patriots to discuss the fight with Mexico (the meeting's leadership did not want to call the meeting a "convention", for fear the Mexican government would view it as an independence forum). Jones himself presented a resolution at the Consultation calling for a convention to be held to declare independence, but he himself refused to be nominated to the convention.

During the Texas Revolution, Jones served as a judge advocate and surgeon to the Texas Army, though he insisted on holding the rank of private throughout the conflict. After the war, Jones returned to Brazoria and resumed his medical practice.

Upon his return to Brazoria, Jones found that James Collinsworth, a fellow Texas patriot and signer of the Texas Declaration of Independence from Brazoria, had set up a law practice in Jones's office. Jones evicted Collinsworth and challenged him to a duel (though the duel never occurred).

Just a few months before the revolution, on March 2, 1834, Jones met with four other Masons at Brazoria and petitioned the Grand Master of Louisiana for a dispensation and a charter to form the first Masonic lodge in Texas. In December, when the lodge was set to labor, Jones was elected its first Master. The charter for Holland Lodge No. 36 arrived during the final days of the revolution, and Jones carried it in his saddlebags during the decisive Battle of San Jacinto on April 21, 1836. At the formation of the Grand Lodge of the Republic of Texas in December 1837, he was elected its first Grand Master. He also became the first Grand Master of the Independent Order of Odd Fellows in Texas.

On May 17, 1840, he married Mary Smith Jones. Together, they had four children.

Move to politics 

Jones and Collinsworth would spar again. Collinsworth was instrumental in starting the Texas Railroad, Navigation, and Banking Company, to which Jones was vehemently opposed. Jones was elected to the Second Texas Congress as an opponent of the company; however, his most significant act in Congress was to call for the withdrawal of the Texas proposal for annexation by the United States. He also helped draw up legislation to regulate medical practice, and called for the establishment of an endowment for a university.

Jones expected to return to his practice at Brazoria after his term in Congress, but Texas President Sam Houston instead appointed him Minister to the United States, where Jones was to formally withdraw the annexation proposal.

During this time, while many Texans hoped to encourage eventual annexation by the United States, some supported waiting for annexation or even remaining independent. The United States, in the late 1830s, was hesitant to annex Texas for fear of provoking a war with Mexico. Jones and others felt that Texas gaining recognition from European states was important, and began to set up trade relations with them, to make annexation of Texas more attractive to the United States, or failing that, to give Texas the strength to remain independent.

Jones was recalled to Texas by new president Mirabeau Lamar in 1839. Back at home, he found himself elected to a partial term in the Senate, where he quickly became a critic of Lamar's administration. He retired from the Senate in 1841, declining the opportunity to serve as Vice President in favor of returning to his medical practice. Late in 1841, though, he was named Texas Secretary of State by President Houston, who had recently been elected president again by opponents of Lamar.

Jones served as Secretary of State until 1844. During his term, the main goal of Texas foreign policy was to get either an offer of annexation from the United States, or a recognition of Texas independence from Mexico, or preferably, both at the same time.

Anson Jones served as the fourth and last President of the Republic of Texas.

After presidency 
Jones hoped that the new Texas state legislature would send him to the United States Senate. He was not chosen, and as time went on, he became increasingly bitter about this slight. Although Jones prospered as a planter and eventually amassed an enormous estate, he was never able to get past the fact that Sam Houston and Thomas Jefferson Rusk were chosen over him to represent Texas in Washington, DC.

After the suicide of Thomas Jefferson Rusk in 1857, Jones became convinced that the legislature would finally send him to the Senate, but he received no votes.

In 1849 Jones was thrown from a horse. His left arm was crushed and became withered and discolored. This injury sent him back east for medical treatment. In the east he was exposed to and found keen interest in new technology, especially railroads.

Death 

For four days, he had lodged at Houston's old Capitol Hotel, the former seat of government of the Republic of Texas. His arm permanently injured in a fall, and having received no votes for a vacant seat in the U.S. Senate, he brooded over his career. After dinner on January 9, 1858, he returned to his room and fatally shot himself. He was 59 years old. Jones was buried at Glenwood Cemetery in Houston.

Legacy 

Jones County, Texas, and its county seat, Anson, were both named for Anson Jones. The Anson Jones Elementary Schools in Bryan and Midland are named for him along with Anson Jones Middle School in San Antonio, as well as Anson Jones Elementary in the Dallas ISD system. His plantation home, known as Barrington, is preserved at Washington-on-the-Brazos State Historic Park.

Anson Jones served as the fourth and last President of the Republic of Texas.

References

Further reading 
 
 Jones Anson (n.d.) Retrieved September 17, 2009

External links 

 Jones, Anson from the Handbook of Texas Online.
 Mary (Mrs. Anson) Jones letters from the University of Houston. Hosted by The Portal to Texas History
 Letters, Relating to the History of Annexation by Anson Jones, 1848. Hosted by The Portal to Texas History
 Memoranda and Official Correspondence Relating to the Republic of Texas, its History and Annexation. Including a Brief Autobiography of the Author by Anson Jones, published 1859. Hosted by The Portal to Texas History
Letters written between (1819–1907) by Mary Smith McCrory Jones, the wife of Anson Jones – Mrs. Anson Jones Letters collection at the University of Houston Digital Library
 Anson Jones – Texas Historical Marker Dedication Ceremony November 21, 2009, Glenwood Cemetery, Houston, Texas.
Anson Jones Historical Marker Dedication Ceremony Program

1798 births
1858 deaths
People from Great Barrington, Massachusetts
Physicians from Texas
American politicians who committed suicide
Masonic Grand Masters
Burials at Glenwood Cemetery (Houston, Texas)
Heads of state who committed suicide
People from Brazoria County, Texas
People from Houston
People of the Texas Revolution
Presidents of the Republic of Texas
Suicides by firearm in Texas
1850s suicides
Members of the Odd Fellows